The Architect is a 2006 American drama film directed by Matt Tauber. Based on the 1996 play by David Greig, the plot is about architect Leo Waters (Anthony LaPaglia), who is confronted by angry residents of a housing complex he designed. The buildings have created a culture of crime in the neighborhood and the residents want them pulled down. The film had its world premiere at the Tribeca Film Festival on April 26, 2006, and received a limited release in the United States on December 1, 2006.

Plot
Leo Waters is a successful architect, who also teaches architecture at a local university. He has a strained relationship with his family, including his wife Julia, who is a housewife who spends her time tending to their luxurious modern house, their son Martin, who recently dropped out of college and has no interest to follow in his father's footsteps and become an architect, and their daughter Christina, who he watches inappropriately at times. 

Tonya Neely is a cleaning lady who lives in a state-funded high-rise public housing project Leo has designed several years ago in Chicago's South Side. Her son committed suicide and her eldest daughter is a young single mom. Meanwhile, Cammie, her youngest daughter attends a prestigious school on a scholarship and lives with a wealthy family Tonya's knows from her work. 

Tonya leads a community effort to demolish the housing project and build a new better one instead. In an attempt to gain support for her cause, Tonya reaches out to Leo in a lecture and asks him to sign her petition calling for the demolition of the project. He initially defends his work, but later comes up with an idea on how to improve the project by modifying its current design without the need for a complete demolition. He later invites Tonya to his house to share his vision but she is appalled by his proposed approach, especially as he has not bothered to visit the project since it was first built.

Meanwhile, Martin travels to the housing project to see it for himself, and meets Shawn, young gay prostitute who lives in the project. Shawn had committed suicide by jumping off a roof of a building, in the same manner Tonya's own son killed himself. 

Leo goes to the housing project to meet Tonya. He tell her that he agrees to sign her petition, but she informs him that the authorities have already agreed to demolish the project. Martin walks to the roof of one of the building where he unexpectedly bumps into his own father, and they share a silent emotional glaze.

Cast
 Anthony LaPaglia as Leo Waters
 Viola Davis as Tonya Neely
 Isabella Rossellini as Julia Waters
 Hayden Panettiere as Christina Waters
 Sebastian Stan as Martin Waters
 Paul James as Shawn
 Serena Reeder as Cammie Neely
 Walton Goggins as Joe

Reception
The film received mixed to negative reviews, it holds an approval rating of 11% on Rotten Tomatoes, based on 38 reviews.

References

External links
 
 

2006 films
2006 drama films
American drama films
American films based on plays
2000s English-language films
Films about architecture
Films about dysfunctional families
Films directed by Matt Tauber
Films scored by Marcelo Zarvos
Films set in Chicago
Films shot in Chicago
Magnolia Pictures films
2006 directorial debut films
2000s American films